Music Inspired by Scarface was released in 2003. This compilation album features songs by
various hip-hop artists which either draw direct inspiration from the 1983 film Scarface or contain subject matter that can relate to the film.

Track listing

References

Hip hop compilation albums
Albums produced by RZA
Albums produced by DJ Premier
Albums produced by Swizz Beatz
Albums produced by Dr. Dre
Albums produced by Ski Beatz
Scarface (1983 film)
2003 compilation albums
Def Jam Recordings compilation albums
Gangsta rap compilation albums